A bag boy is a nickname for a bagger.

Bag boy and bagboy may also refer to:
 "Bagboy" (song), a July 2013 single by the Pixies from the 2014 EP EP3 and the 2014 album Indie Cindy
 Bagboy (TV special), a 2015 television special
 National Lampoon's Bag Boy, a 2007 comedy film

See also
 Bagger (disambiguation)
 Bagman (disambiguation)